Anders Bakken (born 20 June 1955) is a Norwegian cross-country skier.

He was born in Lillehammer, and represented the club Lillehammer SK. He competed at the 1980 Winter Olympics in Lake Placid, where he placed 15th in the 50 km. He was Norwegian champion in 50 km in 1981.

He is the uncle of cross-country skier Ragnhild Haga.

Cross-country skiing results
All results are sourced from the International Ski Federation (FIS).

Olympic Games

World Championships

World Cup

Season standings

References

External links

1955 births
Living people
Sportspeople from Lillehammer
Norwegian male cross-country skiers
Olympic cross-country skiers of Norway
Cross-country skiers at the 1980 Winter Olympics